Malý Újezd is a municipality and village in Mělník District in the Central Bohemian Region of the Czech Republic. It has about 1,100 inhabitants.

Administrative parts
Villages of Jelenice and Vavřineč are administrative parts of Malý Újezd.

References

Villages in Mělník District